CU is the designation of a line for high-voltage direct current (HVDC) transmission between the Coal Creek Station power plant south of Underwood, North Dakota at  and the Dickinson converter station near Buffalo, Minnesota at .

The designation most likely refers to two Minnesota-based power generation/transmission cooperatives that originally partnered to build the Coal Creek plant and associated line - Cooperative Power Association and United Power Association, which later merged to become Great River Energy. Great River Energy recently announced that the mine-mouth plant that supplies this line, Coal Creek Station, will be decommissioned in 2022, unless another entity steps up to acquire (and continue operating) the plant, leaving the future of this line in doubt.

The CU project controversy in 1978 and 1979 was a result of protests by farm landowners in the path of the CU line right of way.

The CU line, which went in service in 1978, can transfer an electrical power of 1,000 megawatts at a symmetrical transmission voltage of 400 kV. An overhead line connection 436 miles (710 kilometers) long is used, with two conductors per pole. Thyristor static inverters are used.

Crossing of HVDC powerlines 
Southeast of Wing, North Dakota, at  CU crosses Square Butte, another HVDC powerline. This is the only crossing point of two HVDC overhead powerlines in the Western hemisphere.

Electrodes 

References 

Energy infrastructure completed in 1979
Electric power transmission systems in the United States
Energy infrastructure in North Dakota
Energy infrastructure in Minnesota
HVDC transmission lines
1979 establishments in Minnesota
1979 establishments in North Dakota